Memory consolidation is a category of processes that stabilize a memory trace after its initial acquisition.  A memory trace is a change in the nervous system caused by memorizing something. Consolidation is distinguished into two specific processes. The first, synaptic consolidation, which is thought to correspond to late-phase long-term potentiation, occurs on a small scale in the synaptic connections and neural circuits within the first few hours after learning. The second process is systems consolidation, occurring on a much larger scale in the brain, rendering hippocampus-dependent memories independent of the hippocampus over a period of weeks to years. Recently, a third process has become the focus of research, reconsolidation, in which previously consolidated memories can be made labile again through reactivation of the memory trace.

History 
Memory consolidation was first referred to in the writings of the renowned Roman teacher of rhetoric Quintillian.  He noted the "curious fact... that the interval of a single night will greatly increase the strength of the memory," and presented the possibility that "... the power of recollection .. undergoes a process of ripening and maturing during the time which intervenes."  The process of consolidation was later proposed based on clinical data illustrated in 1882 by Ribot's Law of Regression, "progressive destruction advances progressively from the unstable to the stable". This idea was elaborated on by William H. Burnham a few years later in a paper on amnesia integrating findings from experimental psychology and neurology.  Coining of the term "consolidation" is credited to the German researchers Müller and Alfons Pilzecker who rediscovered the concept that memory takes time to fixate or undergo "Konsolidierung" in their studies conducted between 1892 and 1900. The two proposed the perseveration-consolidation hypothesis after they found that new information learned could disrupt information previously learnt if not enough time had passed to allow the old information to be consolidated. This led to the suggestion that new memories are fragile in nature but as time passes they become solidified.

Systematic studies of anterograde amnesia started to emerge in the 1960s and 1970s. The case of Henry Molaison, formerly known as patient H.M., became a landmark in studies of memory as it relates to amnesia and the removal of the hippocampal zone and sparked massive interest in the study of brain lesions and their effect on memory. After Molaison underwent a bilateral medial temporal lobe resection to alleviate epileptic symptoms the patient began to suffer from memory impairments. Molaison lost the ability to encode and consolidate newly learned information leading researchers to conclude the medial temporal lobe (MTL) was an important structure involved in this process. Molaison also showed signs of retrograde amnesia spanning a period of about 3 years prior to the surgery suggesting that recently acquired memories of as long as a couple years could remain in the MTL prior to consolidation into other brain areas. Research into other patients with resections of the MTL have shown a positive relationship between the degree of memory impairment and the extent of MTL removal which points to a temporal gradient in the consolidating nature of the MTL.

These studies were accompanied by the creation of animal models of human amnesia in an effort to identify brain substrates critical for slow consolidation.  Meanwhile, neuropharmacological studies of selected brain areas began to shed light on the molecules possibly responsible for fast consolidation. In recent decades, advancements in cellular preparations, molecular biology, and neurogenetics have revolutionized the study of consolidation. Providing additional support is the study of functional brain activity in humans which has revealed that the activity of brain regions changes over time after a new memory is acquired. This change can occur as quickly as a couple hours after the memory has been encoded suggesting that there is a temporal dimension to the reorganization of the memory as it is represented in the brain.

Synaptic consolidation 
Synaptic consolidation is one form of memory consolidation seen across all species and long-term memory tasks. Long-term memory, when discussed in the context of synaptic consolidation, is conventionally said to be memory that lasts for at least 24 hours. Synaptic consolidation is achieved faster than systems consolidation (which is assumed to take weeks, months, or even to years to be accomplished). There is evidence to suggest that synaptic consolidation takes place within minutes to hours of memory encoding or learning (shown, for example, in goldfish), and as such it is considered the 'fast' type of consolidation. It is also referred to as 'initial consolidation'. As soon as six hours after training, memories become impervious to interferences that disrupt synaptic consolidation and the formation of long-term memory. Late-phase LTP, the long-lasting form of one of the best understood forms of synaptic plasticity, is thought to be the cellular process underlying synaptic consolidation.

Standard model 
The standard model of synaptic consolidation suggests that alterations of synaptic protein synthesis and changes in membrane potential are achieved through activating intracellular transduction cascades. These molecular cascades trigger transcription factors that lead to changes in gene expression. The result of the gene expression is the lasting alteration of synaptic proteins, as well as synaptic remodeling and growth. In a short time-frame immediately following learning, the molecular cascade, expression and process of both transcription factors and immediate early genes, are susceptible to disruptions.  Disruptions caused by specific drugs, antibodies and gross physical trauma can block the effects of synaptic consolidation.

Long-term potentiation 

LTP can be thought of as the prolonged strengthening of synaptic transmission, and is known to produce increases in the neurotransmitter production and receptor sensitivity, lasting minutes to even days. The process of LTP is regarded as a contributing factor to synaptic plasticity and in the growth of synaptic strength, which are suggested to underlie memory formation. LTP is also considered to be an important mechanism in terms of maintaining memories within brain regions, and therefore is thought to be involved in learning. There is compelling evidence that LTP is critical for Pavlovian fear conditioning in rats suggesting that it mediates learning and memory in mammals. Specifically, NMDA-receptor antagonists appear to block the induction of both LTP and fear conditioning and that fear conditioning increases amygdaloidal synaptic transmission that would result in LTP.

Spacing effect 

Distributed learning has been found to enhance memory consolidation, specifically for relational memory. Experimental results suggest that distributing learning over the course of 24 hours decreases the rate of forgetting compared to massed learning, and enhances relational memory consolidation. When interpreted in the context of synaptic consolidation, mechanisms of synaptic strengthening may depend on the spacing of memory reactivation to allow sufficient time for protein synthesis to occur, and thereby strengthen long-term memory.

One study that demonstrates this effect was conducted in 1984 by Smith and Rothkopf. In this experiment, subjects were sorted into three groups to test retention and learning. "Each group was taught the same 8 hour statistics class, but one group was taught the class in one day, the next over the course of four days in one room, and the last was taught the class over the course of four days in different rooms. The subjects were tested five days later in a completely new setting. The results of the experiment were that taking the class over a period of four days was much more effective than taking it in one single mass. Interestingly, the group that took the course over four days and in different rooms performed the best in the final retention test out of all the groups."  This shows that spacing out study sessions and studying in different environments helps with retention as it provides time for the brain to consolidate the information without being interrupted by new information. The benefits of spacing were also demonstrated in an earlier study by Reder and Anderson (1982) which yielded similar results, confirming the spacing effect’s relevance and effects on learning.

Protein synthesis 
Protein synthesis plays an important role in the formation of new memories. Studies have shown that protein synthesis inhibitors administered after learning, weaken memory, suggesting that protein synthesis is required for memory consolidation. Additionally, reports have suggested that the effects of protein synthesis inhibitors also inhibit LTP. However, other results have shown that protein synthesis may not in fact be necessary for memory consolidation, as it has been found that the formation of memories can withstand vast amounts of protein synthesis inhibition, suggesting that this criterion of protein synthesis as necessary for memory consolidation is not unconditional.

Systems consolidation 
Systems consolidation is the second form of memory consolidation. It is a reorganization process in which memories from the hippocampal region, where memories are first encoded, are moved to the neo-cortex in a more permanent form of storage. Systems consolidation is a slow dynamic process that can take anywhere from one to two decades to be fully formed in humans, unlike synaptic consolidation that only takes minutes to hours for new information to stabilize into memories.

Standard model 
The standard model of systems consolidation has been summarized by Squire and Alvarez (1995); it states that when novel information is originally encoded and registered, memory of these new stimuli becomes retained in both the hippocampus and cortical regions. Later the hippocampus' representations of this information become active in explicit (conscious) recall or implicit (unconscious) recall like in sleep and 'offline' processes.

Memory is retained in the hippocampus for up to one week after initial learning, representing the hippocampus-dependent stage. During this stage the hippocampus is 'teaching' the cortex more and more about the information and when the information is recalled it strengthens the cortico-cortical connection thus making the memory hippocampus-independent. Therefore, from one week and beyond the initial training experience, the memory is slowly transferred to the neo-cortex where it becomes permanently stored. In this view the hippocampus can perform the task of storing memories temporarily because the synapses are able to change quickly whereas the neocortical synapses change over time. Consolidation is thus the process whereby the hippocampus activates the neocortex continually leading to strong connections between the two. Since the hippocampus can only support memories temporarily the remaining activation will be seen only in the neocortex which is able to support memory indefinitely. Squire and Alvarez took the temporally graded nature of patients with retrograde amnesia as support for the notion that once a connection has been established within the neocortex the hippocampus is no longer required, but this process is dynamic and extends for several years.

Squire and Alvarez also proposed the idea that MTL structures play a role in the consolidation of memories within the neocortex by providing a binding area for multiple cortical regions involved in the initial encoding of the memory. In this sense the MTL would act as a relay station for the various perceptual input that make up a memory and stores it as a whole event. After this has occurred the MTL directs information towards the neocortex to provide a permanent representation of the memory.

Multiple trace theory
Multiple trace theory (MTT) builds on the distinction between semantic memory and episodic memory and addresses perceived shortcomings of the standard model with respect to the dependency of the hippocampus. MTT argues that the hippocampus is always involved in the retrieval and storage of episodic memories. It is thought that semantic memories, including basic information encoded during the storage of episodic memories, can be established in structures apart from the hippocampal system such as the neo-cortex in the process of consolidation. Hence, while proper hippocampal functioning is necessary for the retention and retrieval of episodic memories, it is less necessary during the encoding and use of semantic memories. As memories age there are long-term interactions between the hippocampus and neo-cortex and this leads to the establishment of aspects of memory within structures aside from the hippocampus. MTT thus states that both episodic and semantic memories rely on the hippocampus and the latter becomes somewhat independent of the hippocampus during consolidation. 
An important distinction between MTT and the standard model is that the standard model proposes that all memories become independent of the hippocampus after several years. However, Nadel and Moscovitch have shown that the hippocampus was involved in memory recall for all remote autobiographical memories no matter of their age. An important point they make while interpreting the results is that activation in the hippocampus was equally as strong regardless of the fact that the memories recalled were as old as 45 years prior to the date of the experiment. This is complicated by the fact that the hippocampus is constantly involved in the encoding of new events and activation due to this fact is hard to separate using baseline measures. Because of this, activation of the hippocampus during retrieval of distant memories may simply be a by-product of the subject encoding the study as an event.

Criticisms
Haist, Gore, and Mao, sought to examine the temporal nature of consolidation within the hippocampus to test MTT against the standard view. They found that the hippocampus does not substantially contribute to the recollection of remote memories after a period of a few years. They claim that advances in the functional magnetic resonance imaging have allowed them to improve their distinction between the hippocampus and the entorhinal cortex which they claim is more enduring in its activation from remote memory retrieval. They also criticize the use of memories during testing which cannot be confirmed as accurate. Finally, they state that the initial interview in the scanner acted as an encoding event as such differences between recent and remote memories would be obscured.

Semantic vs. episodic memory 
Nadel and Moscovitch argued that when studying the structures and systems involved in memory consolidation, semantic memory and episodic memory need to be distinguished as relying on two different memory systems. When episodic information is encoded there are semantic aspects of the memory that are encoded as well and this is proposed as an explanation of the varying gradients of memory loss seen in amnesic patients. Amnesic patients with hippocampal damage show traces of memories and this has been used as support for the standard model because it suggests that memories are retained apart from the hippocampal system. Nadel and Moscovitch argue that these retained memories have lost the richness of experience and exist as depersonalized events that have been semanticized over time. They suggest that this instead provides support for their notion that episodic memories rely significantly on the hippocampal system but semantic memories can be established elsewhere in the brain and survive hippocampal damage.

Declarative vs. procedural knowledge consolidation
Learning can be distinguished by two forms of knowledge: declarative and procedural. Declarative information includes the conscious recall of facts, episodes, and lists, and its storage typically connected with the mediotemporal lobe and the hippocampal systems as it includes the encoding of both semantic and episodic information of events. Procedural knowledge however has been said to function separate from this system as it relies primarily on motor areas of the brain. The implicit nature of procedural knowledge allows it to exist absent from the conscious awareness that the information is there. Amnesic patients have shown retained ability to be trained on tasks and exhibit learning without the subject being aware that the training had ever taken place. This introduces a dissociation between the two forms of memory and the fact that one form can exist absent the other suggests separate mechanisms are involved in consolidation. Squire has proposed the procedural knowledge is consolidated in some cases by the extrapyramidal motor system. Squire demonstrated that intact learning of certain motor, perceptual, and cognitive skills can be retained in patients with amnesia. They also retain the ability to be influenced by priming effects without the patients being able to consciously recall any training session occurring.

Emotional and stressful memory consolidation
The amygdala, specifically the basolateral region (BLA) is involved in the encoding of significant experiences and has been directly linked to memorable events. Extensive evidence suggests that stress hormones such as epinephrine play a critical role in consolidating new memories and this is why stressful memories are recalled vividly. Studies by Gold and van Buskirk provided initial evidence for this relationship when they showed that injections of epinephrine into subjects following a training period resulted in greater long-term retention of task related memories. This study also provided evidence that the level of epinephrine injected was related to the level of retention suggesting that the level of stress or emotionality of the memory plays a role on the level of retention. It is suggested that epinephrine affects memory consolidation by activating the amygdala and studies have shown that antagonism of beta-andrenoreceptors prior to injection of epinephrine will block the retention of memory effects seen previously. This is supported by the fact that beta-adrenoreceptor agonists have the opposite effect on the enhancement of memory consolidation. The BLA is thought to be actively involved in memory consolidation and is influenced strongly by stress hormones resulting in increased activation and as such increased memory retention. The BLA then projects to the hippocampus resulting in a strengthened memory. This relationship was studied by Packard and Chen who found that when glutamate was administered to the hippocampus, enhanced consolidation was seen during food-rewarded maze tasks. The opposite effect was also seen when the amygdala was inactivated using lidocaine. Studies appear to suggest that the amygdala effects the consolidation of memories through its influence with stress hormones and the projections to other brain areas implicated in memory consolidation.

Sleep consolidation 

Rapid eye movement (REM) sleep has been thought of to be an important concept in the overnight learning in humans by establishing information in the hippocampal and cortical regions of the brain. REM sleep elicits an increase in neuronal activity following an enriched or novel waking experience, thus increasing neuronal plasticity and therefore playing an essential role in the consolidation of memories. This has come into question in recent years however and studies on sleep deprivation have shown that animals and humans who are denied REM sleep do not show deficits in task learning. It has been proposed that since the brain is in a non-memory encoding state during sleep, consolidation would be unlikely to occur.

More recent studies, however, have looked at the relationship between slow-wave sleep and memory consolidation, rather than REM sleep. One study found that low levels of acetylcholine found in the central nervous system, which are present during slow-wave sleep, aid in the consolidation of memories and therefore assist in the learning process.
 
Recent studies have examined the relationship between REM sleep and procedural learning consolidation.  
In particular studies have been done on sensory and motor related tasks. In one study testing finger-tapping, people were split into two groups and tested post-training with or without intervening sleep; results concluded that sleep post-training increases both speed and accuracy in this particular task, while increasing the activation of both cortical and hippocampal regions; whereas the post-training awake group had no such improvements. It has been theorized that this may be related more-so to a process of synaptic consolidation rather than systems consolidation because of the short-term nature of the process involved. Researchers examining the effect of sleep on motor learning have noted that while consolidation occurs over a period of 4–6 hours during sleep, this is also true during waking hours, which may negate any role of sleep in learning. In this sense sleep would serve no special purpose to enhance consolidation of memories because it occurs independently of sleep.
Other studies have examined the process of replay which has been described as a reactivation of patterns that were stimulated during a learning phase. Replay has been demonstrated in the hippocampus and this has lent support to the notion that it serves a consolidation purpose. However, replay is not specific to sleep and both rats and primates show signs during restful-awake periods. Also, replay may simply be residual activation in areas that were involved previously in the learning phase and may have no actual effect on consolidation. This reactivation of the memory traces has also been seen in non-REM sleep specifically for hippocampus-dependant memories. Researchers have noted strong reactivation of the hippocampus during sleep immediately after a learning task. This reactivation led to enhanced performance on the learned task. One such experiment had participants learn word pair associations (declarative memories) before either retention periods of sleep or periods of wakefulness. Researchers found that retrieval expectancy played a role as to whether participants were able to retain the information, as the participants that had been told about the delayed retrieval test performed better. However, their research showed that sleep was more likely to benefit the consolidation of memories if the information was relevant to future events or behaviors. Researchers following this line of work have come to assume that dreams are a by-product of the reactivation of the brain areas and this can explain why dreams may be unrelated to the information being consolidated. The dream experience itself is not what enhances memory performance but rather it is the reactivation of the neural circuits that causes this. Other researchers have looked at the role growth hormones play in the consolidation of memories, particularly those of procedural and declarative memories. They found that although growth hormones support general brain systems and memory functioning, it is still unclear if growth hormones play a role in the formation and processing of particular memories during sleep periods.

Cortical slow oscillation- and spindle-complexes 
Memory consolidation during sleep via reactivation of prior experiences and information is associated with sleep signatures of cortical "slow oscillations" and sleep spindles that are involved in the information flow between relevant brain areas. A more complete understanding of these mechanics may possibly allow purposely enabling or strengthening this reactivation.

Zif268 & REM sleep 
Zif268 is an Immediate early gene (IEG) thought to be involved in neuroplasticity by an up-regulation of the transcription factor during REM sleep after pre-exposure to an enriched environment. Results from studies testing the effects of zif268 on mice brains postmortem, suggest that a waking experience prior to sleep can have an enduring effect in the brain, due to an increase of neuroplasticity.

Reconsolidation 
Memory reconsolidation is the process of previously consolidated memories being recalled and actively consolidated. It is a distinct process that serves to maintain, strengthen and modify memories that are already stored in the long-term memory. Once memories undergo the process of consolidation and become part of long-term memory, they are thought of as stable. However, the retrieval of a memory trace can cause another labile phase that then requires an active process to make the memory stable after retrieval is complete.  It is believed that post-retrieval stabilization is different and distinct from consolidation, despite its overlap in function (e.g. storage) and its mechanisms (e.g. protein synthesis). Memory modification needs to be demonstrated in the retrieval in order for this independent process to be valid.

History 
The theory of reconsolidation has been debated for many years and is still controversial. Reconsolidation was first conceptualized in light of the discovery that phobias could often be eliminated by means of electroconvulsive shock therapy (ECT). This seemed to indicate the involvement of a re-consolidation process for excited memories, and that the operation active in ECT was the disruption of that process; here, of the reconsolidation of retrieved fear memories by shock administration.

Further studies investigated the concept, using ECT to test for reconsolidation; ECT was already known as an amnesic agent (leads to memory loss). These studies found it to be effective on retrieved memories when administered directly after the retrieval of a memory.

Later research, wherein fear memories had been established in rats through Pavlovian fear conditioning, found that a consolidated fear memory can be brought to a labile state, by means of immediate amygdala infusions of the protein synthesis inhibitor anisomycin, but not by infusions made six hours afterwards. It was concluded that consolidated fear memory, when reactivated, enters a changeable state that requires de novo protein synthesis for new consolidation, i.e., re-consolidation of the old memory. Nader, Schafe, and Le Doux (2000) demonstrated that the reconsolidation  process may make memories more malleable than previously believed. Nader and his colleagues trained rats to be afraid of a tone by pairing the tone with a small shock. Groups of rats were then injected with anisomycin, an antibiotic that restricts protein synthesis, at different points in time. The rats that were injected with anisomycin after consolidation had taken place, retained the fear reaction to the tone. However, the rats that were injected before consolidation and reconsolidation could take place, did not retain the fear response when they heard the tone again later. It seems that interference that is made before memories are consolidated affect the way they are remembered later. 

Brunet and colleagues (2008) studied patients that had been diagnosed with Post Traumatic Stress Disorder (PTSD).  Following the same method that Nader and his associates used, Brunet induced anxiety responses in the patients by having them listen to a 30 second recording describing the circumstances of their traumatic experiences. The patients were shortly thereafter injected with propranolol, a drug that blocks stress hormone receptors in the amygdala which is implicated in neurologically representing the emotional content of memories. These patients experienced a significant reduction in PTSD symptoms months after treatment. These findings were confirmed in later studies done in 2009 by Kindt and colleagues and in 2010 by Schiller and colleagues. 

These studies done by Nader and others seem to suggest that as memories are being remembered, they are fragile, as if experiencing them for the first time.  

In addition to fear memories, appetitive memories are also prone to reconsolidation episodes, which can likewise be disrupted; namely, after local administration of a protein activity inhibitor.

Since those breakthrough studies were done, there have been several others to probe the theory of memory reconsolidation. Subjects in these studies, along with humans, have included crabs, chicks, honeybees, medaka fish, lymnaea, and various rodents. Further studies have demonstrated an analogue of memory reconsolidation in spinal cord pain processing pathways, suggesting a general role for reconsolidation in the central nervous system.

Criticisms 
Some studies have supported this theory, while others have failed to demonstrate disruption of consolidated memory after retrieval. It is important to note that negative results may be examples of conditions where memories are not susceptible to a permanent disruption, thus a determining factor of reconsolidation. After much debate and a detailed review of this field it had been concluded that reconsolidation was a real phenomenon.  Tronson and Taylor compiled a lengthy summary of multiple reconsolidation studies, noting a number of studies were unable to show memory impairments due to blocked reconsolidation.  However the need for standardized methods was underscored as in some learning tasks such as fear conditioning, certain forms of memory reactivation could actually represent new extinction learning rather than activation of an old memory trace.  Under this possibility, traditional disruptions of reconsolidation might actually maintain the original memory trace but preventing the consolidation of extinction learning. Recent work has suggested that epigenetic modifications may also prevent reconsolidation in some cases. The removal of these epigenetic modifications with inhibitors of histone deacetylase enabled the erasure of remote memories after recall.

Reconsolidation experiments are more difficult to run than typical consolidation experiments as disruption of a previously consolidated memory must be shown to be specific to the reactivation of the original memory trace.  Furthermore, it is important to demonstrate that the vulnerability of reactivation occurs in a limited time frame, which can be assessed by delaying infusion till six hours after reactivation.  It is also useful to show that the behavioral measure used to assess disruption of memory is not just due to task impairment caused by the procedure, which can be demonstrated by testing control groups in absence of the original learning.  Finally, it is important to rule out alternative explanations, such as extinction learning by lengthening the reactivation phase. There have also been concerns about the use of reconsolidation research to justify psychotherapy treatments, and the generalizability of basic reconsolidation research into the therapy room

Distinctions from consolidation 
Questions arose if reconsolidation was a unique process or merely another phase of consolidation.  Both consolidation and reconsolidation can be disrupted by pharmacological agents (e.g. the protein synthesis inhibitor anisomycin) and both require the transcription factor CREB. However, recent amygdala research suggests that BDNF is required for consolidation (but not reconsolidation) whereas the transcription factor and immediate early gene Zif268 is required for reconsolidation but not consolidation.  A similar double dissociation between Zif268 for reconsolidation and BDNF for consolidation was found in the hippocampus for fear conditioning. However, not all memory tasks show this double dissociation, such as object recognition memory.

Reconsolidation in psychotherapy 
In the decade between 2005 and 2015, at least five groups argued the notion that memory reconsolidation can be used to treat psychological problems. Three of these groups have proposed that the wide variety of different psychotherapies produce permanent change in clients to the extent that they manage to activate this same neurobiological mechanism of reconsolidation in a way that leads to deconsolidation. One example of this is the Lefkoe Method, created in 1985 by Morty Lefkoe, president and founder of the Lefkoe Institute. Memory reconsolidation may be a common factor in many forms of psychotherapy.

See also

 Atkinson–Shiffrin memory model
 Coherence therapy
 Engram
 Patient HM
 Sharp wave–ripple complexes

References

Further reading 
 
 
 
 
 
 

Memory
Unsolved problems in neuroscience